English singer Robbie Williams has released nine video albums and has been featured in fifty-six music videos and several films.

Music videos

Video albums

See also 
Take That videography

References

External links 
Robbie Williams / Vevo on YouTube

Videography
Williams, Robbie